The Frabosana is a breed of sheep from the valleys of the Monregalese, the area around Mondovì in the province of Cuneo, in Piemonte in north-west Italy. It takes its name from the comuni of Frabosa Soprana and Frabosa Sottana, and was once the most numerous sheep breed of Piemonte. It is raised in the Valle Gesso, the Valle Grana, the Valle Pesio, the Valle Vermenagna and the Valli Monregalesi in the province of Cuneo, and in the Val Pellice in the province of Turin. Two types are recognised within the breed, the Roaschino in the Ligurian Alps, and the slightly smaller Frabosana raised in the area of Mondovì. The Frabosana is one of the forty-two autochthonous local sheep breeds of limited distribution for which a herdbook is kept by the Associazione Nazionale della Pastorizia, the Italian national association of sheep-breeders.

The conservation status of the breed was listed as "not at risk" by the FAO in 2007. In 2013 total numbers for the breed were 4284.

References

Sheep breeds originating in Italy
Ark of Taste foods